Sânpaul is a commune in Cluj County, Transylvania, Romania. It is composed of six villages: Berindu (Nádasberend), Mihăiești (Nádasszentmihály), Sânpaul, Sumurducu (Szomordok), Șardu (Magyarsárd) and Topa Mică (Pusztatopa).

Demographics 
According to the census from 2002 there was a total population of 2,563 people living in this commune. Of this population, 86.57% are ethnic Romanians, 12.99% ethnic Romani and 0.42% are ethnic Hungarians.

Natives
Ioan Alexandru

References

Communes in Cluj County
Localities in Transylvania